Karmo may refer to:
Karmo, Iran, a village in Markazi Province, Iran
Alex Karmo (b. 1989), Liberian footballer